Jane Fonda's Workout, also known as Workout Starring Jane Fonda, is a 1982 exercise video by actress Jane Fonda, based on an exercise routine developed by Leni Cazden and refined by Cazden and Fonda at Workout, their exercise studio in Beverly Hills. The video release by Karl Home Video and RCA Video Productions was aimed primarily at women as a way to exercise at home. The video was part of a series of exercise products: Jane Fonda's Workout Book was released in November 1981, and both Jane Fonda's Workout video tape and Jane Fonda's Workout Record, published as a double-LP vinyl album, appeared in late April 1982. In July 1982, Fonda's exercise video was released on RCA SelectaVision videodisc. The VHS tape became a bestseller, and Fonda released further videos throughout the 1980s and into 1995. The video also increased the sales of video playback units. 

The original 1982 Jane Fonda's Workout was the first non-theatrical home video release to top sales charts, and it was the top-selling VHS tape for six years. In total, Fonda sold 17 million videos in the 1982–1995 series, considered an enormous success. Fonda's accomplishment spawned imitators and sparked a boom of women's exercise classes, opening the formerly male-dominated fitness industry to women, and establishing the celebrity-as-fitness-instructor model. The ballet-style leg warmers she wore increased the popularity of an ongoing fashion trend, and her encouraging shout, "Feel the burn!", became a common saying, along with the proverb, "No pain, no gain."

The success of Fonda's workout series funded her political activism, which was her original goal. 

In 2010, Fonda resumed the series, focused on exercises for women over 50. She sold DVDs and later posted exercise videos online for streaming or downloading. In 2020, she referred back to her video series with a brief home video clip showing her doing leg lifts at age 82.

Exercise studio, book, and LP
In 1978, Fonda broke an ankle bone while filming The China Syndrome, forcing a stop to her ballet exercises. She sought a new exercise regimen that would help her lose weight and stay trim, without stressing her foot. She was referred to Leni Cazden, an exercise instructor in Century City who formulated a lengthy exercise sequence to burn calories. Fonda took classes from Cazden, and adopted her style of exercise. Fonda later recalled that women in 1978 had few choices for exercise classes, that most gyms were designed for men. She said, "We weren’t supposed to sweat or have muscles. Now, along with forty other women, I found myself moving nonstop for an hour and a half in entirely new ways". On location in Utah shooting The Electric Horseman in late 1978 and early 1979, Fonda taught her actor colleagues the exercises she had learned from Cazden, and was encouraged by the warm reception. In May 1979, she partnered with Cazden to open an exercise studio called Workout, the sign over the door stating "Jane Fonda’s Workout", located on Robertson Boulevard in Beverly Hills. One week of instruction (five one-hour sessions) cost $32.50. Two to three thousand customers attended per week, likely because Fonda taught some of the morning classes. The new business was profitable. With the concept proved, she added a second studio in Encino and a third in San Francisco. She wrote Jane Fonda's Workout Book to bring the technique to a wider audience. The book was published through Paramount-owned Simon & Schuster and sold 2 million copies.

In parallel with the exercise book, Fonda released the vinyl LP Jane Fonda's Workout Record through Columbia Records in April 1982, which sold steadily at $12.98. It was certified double Platinum by the Recording Industry Association of America in December 1984. On the album, Fonda speaks as exercise instructor, backed by music. The double album contained songs by the Jacksons, the Brothers Johnson, Boz Scaggs, REO Speedwagon, Sylvester, Quincy Jones and others. A cassette tape version was also sold. While preparing the book and audio recording, Fonda was already considering a video.

Video

Exercise industry
Exercise products had already been selling briskly before Fonda entered the field. Carol Hensel released an aerobic Dancercize album in 1980, selling 500,000 LPs and starting the 1980s craze for exercise. Hensel's later Dance & Exercise videos went Platinum. Richard Simmons was already producing exercise records; his 1982 Reach LP was certified Platinum before it shipped, based on advance orders.

A cheaply made exercise video was the first in the home video category: Video Aerobics featuring Leslie Lilien and Julie Lavin, available on videotape in 1979. The same title appeared in 1982–83 in an updated new shoot. Erotic photographer Ron Harris produced the Aerobicise program which aired on paid cable TV, and in early 1982 he sold a novelty aerobics video tape, Aerobicise: The Beautiful Workout, featuring close-up shots of the exercising women. Harris's abstract camera work was seen as an application of "art instead of instruction", appealing to men, useless for exercise. 

There are two conflicting stories about how Fonda's exercise video project was started. Stuart Karl's version is that he brought the idea to Fonda in late 1981, after the book came out in November, while Richard D. Klinger says he and Karl called Fonda in early 1981 before the book. The first version is as follows: Karl was a young entrepreneur in Southern California, starting a magazine company and shifting to home video publishing: Karl Home Video. His wife, Deborah, saw Fonda's Workout book promoted in a store window, and remarked that she would rather watch Fonda teach the workout on home video. Seeing that the exercise video category had just opened, Karl contacted Fonda's husband, activist and politician Tom Hayden, to propose the idea as a source of campaign funding. Hayden put Karl in touch with Fonda, but she initially declined; the home video market was new and unfamiliar to her – she did not know a single person who owned a videocassette recorder (VCR). Karl persisted, and Fonda was persuaded by the possibility of extra money for her Campaign for Economic Democracy (CED), a political action committee founded by Hayden and Fonda in 1976 to promote liberal and progressive issues. Karl teamed with RCA Video Productions on the project. Fonda signed with Karl and RCA in early 1982.

The second version is told by corporate attorney Richard D. Klinger of RCA Records, an executive in the company's SelectaVision video group. In early 1981, Karl and Klinger contacted Fonda about shooting a video of her Beverly Hills exercise routine. At the time, she was still creating Jane Fonda's Workout Book, and she said she should first present the video idea to her book publisher, Simon & Schuster. David Obst at Simon & Schuster was keen on the proposal, but it was rejected by their affiliate Paramount Home Video. Fonda returned to Klinger and Karl who then entered into a joint production deal such that RCA would make the video discs while Karl would make the video tapes. Klinger, the husband of singer Janis Hansen, was named West Coast director of RCA Video in January 1982. Karl Home Video and RCA Video Productions began shooting Fonda's video in early 1982. Simon & Schuster later regretted their decision, and by 1985 they were shopping for video projects. Paramount head Barry Diller said in August 1983 that Paramount ignored obtaining publishing rights to business opportunities such as the Fonda workout video because "nobody" at Paramount was familiar with the process. After this prominent failure, Diller said Paramount vigorously pursued the rights to related business ideas.

Fonda's Workout
With a budget of $50,000 $75,000 or $100,000, Fonda started shooting the video with her friend, director Sid Galanty, a fellow Democrat known for making political advertisements for television. Fonda suggested that she act out a scripted role but Galanty convinced her to ad-lib and be herself. Galanty proposed shooting outdoors but Fonda insisted on a sprung floor suitable for dancers. Fonda's Beverly Hills studio proved to be incompatible because the mirrored walls reflected lights and cameras. Instead, Galanty built a theatrical set for the video, and the production crew worked out the many technical problems. Filming with music was impractical because the recording of Fonda's voice needed to be as pure as possible, so only the beats, the lowest frequencies of the music were amplified, to be filtered out in the editing. Fonda was unable to simultaneously talk to the viewer and count through her movements, so she took timing cues from hand gestures given by assistants stationed at the camera. Behind Fonda and likewise barefoot, a group of seven instructors and students from her exercise studios took part in the routine; they, too, watched the timing cues. Every exercise sequence was filmed in one long take, and if Fonda or Galanty saw a problem in playback, they filmed the whole sequence over again, which was physically demanding. Principal photography was done in three days, and editing was finished by mid-March.

The Workout video was released on April 24, 1982, at the price of $59.95 for the video tape, . Karl Home Video brought out the video tape, and three months later RCA Video Productions issued the workout on Capacitance Electronic Disc (CED), a vinyl video format, selling for $24.98; less than half the cost of the tape. Galanty was listed as producer. Joe Chemay and John Hobbs composed Fonda's original theme music for the video; the two had worked together on Chemay's 1981 R&B-pop album The Riper the Finer. Fonda's Workout appeared on the video sales chart of Billboard magazine on May 22, 1982, entering at number 23. The video rose up the chart to the number 4 position on June 19, and from that point, stayed at number 4 and above for three years. During 1982–85, the video topped the chart for a total of 41 weeks, dipping to number 2 for 75 weeks. At that time, no other video came close to this level of sales performance. Fonda herself prevented the Workout video from racking up better chart statistics, as she was competing against it through the home video release of her film On Golden Pond (1981) which was number 1 for 15 weeks in 1982. Three years later, Fonda charted with the home video release of We Are the World: The Video Event which she narrated. We Are the World hit number 1 in August 1985, edging the Workout video down to number 2. Many of Fonda's later videos in the workout series also charted: in February 1985, three at once were in the Top Ten of Billboard chart. Billboard magazine featured Fonda on the cover at the end of August 1985, describing her "Video Victory" and carrying articles about the actress, the exercise series, and the surprising sales juggernaut.

Lorimar Productions was a television production company known for many hit TV shows including the immensely popular Dallas. Lorimar wanted a share of the profits from Fonda's Workout series, and so bought out Karl in October 1984 for a reported $3 million, rebranding the company as Karl-Lorimar. Karl stayed in command of the workout video department adding more Fonda titles as well as some by Richard Simmons.

The RCA SelectaVision version of the video offered two audio channels, one with Fonda's verbal instruction, and the other with monaural music. The consumer would normally listen to both at once, but after they had memorized the routine, they could listen to the music by itself. List price of a stereo CED player was $450, . 

As the videos took off, Julie LaFond was hired as the manager of Fonda's Workout franchise. Fonda and LaFond closed the San Francisco Workout studio in 1983 after two years of operation. The noise of the exercising was being conveyed through the building structure to other tenants who were complaining. In 1986, the Encino location was shuttered after posting losses. In April 1991, Fonda's original Beverly Hills location closed, even though it was still profitable. Fonda said she was concentrating on her core business which by this time was the video tape series, run by LaFond.

Fonda contracted with Capri Beachwear in June 1983 to produce a line of Workout-branded exercise clothing, designed by Broadway costumer Theoni V. Aldredge, and made in the U.S. by union shops. The clothing was to be sold at Macy's and Saks Fifth Avenue, but after the line appeared piecemeal and incomplete for a few months, the enterprise folded in 1984. Thoroughgoing supply problems, high retail price tags and market inexperience all contributed to the failure. Capri Beachwear absorbed the losses and shut down, bankrupting owner Ron Mester.

Activism

Fonda used her workout profits to fund her political activism. The entire Workout franchise contributed, including the studios, the book, the audio recording and the videos. In early 1984, Fonda withdrew funding from the Campaign for Economic Democracy to pursue her own interests separate from Hayden's. A few months later, Barbra Streisand, Fonda, and ten other women formed the Hollywood Women's Political Committee (HWPC). Though she was not directly active in the day-to-day decisions of the HWPC, its political goals were many of the same ones Fonda had promoted with Hayden through the CED PAC. In 1987, Fonda bought her Workout franchise back from CED. By 1988, Fonda had donated about $10 million to political causes; all drawn from her workout video series.

Karl emulated Fonda by putting some of his Workout video distribution profits into political donations, but his naïveté led him to give many thousands illegally to various politicians, especially to the 1988 campaign of Democratic presidential primary candidate Gary Hart. Hart had been the frontrunner in polls in April 1987, and the favored candidate of Fonda and Hayden, but he resigned from the race in May after news reports showed him to be unfaithful to his wife. In December 1987 he declared a second run, and Karl broke federal campaign guidelines to fund Hart's new effort. The shady dealings were revealed by the Miami Herald at the beginning of 1988. Hart resigned a second and final time in March. In federal court, Karl pleaded guilty to hiding $185,000 in political donations through reimbursed third parties, and was hit with a fine of $60,000 and a sentence of probation for three years. Faced with business losses and conflict-of-interest lawsuits, in July 1989 he declared bankruptcy, and died in 1991 of skin cancer at the age of 38.

Legacy
The fitness industry traces a large measure of its success to Fonda's Workout series. Equinox Group's National Director Carol Espel said about Fonda, "She opened the door for us who were either dancers or interested in fitness to become professionals and create an industry... She helped legitimize fitness as a viable business." Many dance and fitness instructors of the late 1970s and early 1980s rode the wave created by Workout, expanding their businesses dramatically. Richard Simmons embraced the new video format with 1985's Get Started. Jazzercise was already an established exercise studio in the North County San Diego area, releasing a popular LP, but after Fonda the company grew very quickly, releasing aerobics videos and opening many franchise studios. In 1985, fitness teacher Joanie Greggains shifted from LPs to video with Total Shape Up, and in 1987, personal trainer Kathy Smith followed suit by releasing Starting Out for beginners. Jake Steinfeld of Body by Jake fame delivered the Energize Yourself video in 1986. On the other hand, aerobics dance pioneer Jacki Sorensen watched her large organization reduce in size through the 1980s, partly because of competition.

A handful of celebrities capitalized on the exercise video concept, including Cher, Arnold Schwarzenegger, Caitlyn Jenner, Pat Boone, Debbie Reynolds and Raquel Welch. While Fonda encouraged her viewers to get in shape so that they could go out and change the world, the message in Welch's yoga-oriented video was to get in shape to change the inner self. These stars enjoyed limited sales, never matching Fonda's reach.

In 2010, Fonda released the first of three videos in her new series titled Prime Time, aimed at users 50 years and older. In 2014 after many requests, she re-released five of her original 1980s videos on DVD and digital download, followed in 2018 by the re-release of another two of her videos from the early 1990s. In 2020 during the COVID-19 pandemic, Fonda recorded a brief exercise sequence at age 82, sympathizing with people who exercise at home while quarantined. Combining her political activism with 1980s-era video scenes and recently shot footage, Fonda gained views on Instagram and TikTok.

Exercise videos

See also
20th century women's fitness culture

References

External links
Jane Fonda's Original Workout website

Aerobic exercise
Exercise-related trademarks
Home video releases
1982 works